Gaddesden may refer to:

People
 John of Gaddesden, English physician

Places
England
 Great Gaddesden, Hertfordshire
 Gaddesden Place, country house in the above village
 Little Gaddesden, Hertfordshire